Radu or Radow in Iran may refer to:
 Radu-ye Pain
 Radu-ye Polan